Ashraf Shatat (born 13 January 1980) is a retired Jordanian footballer of Palestinian origin who played as a midfielder.

References
 Bani Hassan Includes Shatat of Al-Jazeera (Amman) 
 Shatat: "I Will Abandon Football" 
 Shatat: "I Will Retire Playing Football...And I'll Be Going For Coaching"

External links 
 
 

1980 births
Living people
Jordanian footballers
Jordan international footballers
Jordanian people of Palestinian descent
Association football midfielders
Sportspeople from Amman